Sainte-Léocadie (named after the catholic saint Leocadia) is a commune in the Pyrénées-Orientales department in southern France.

Geography 
Sainte-Léocadie is located in the canton of Les Pyrénées catalanes and in the arrondissement of Prades. Sainte-Léocadie station has rail connections to Villefranche-de-Conflent and Latour-de-Carol.

Climate

Population

See also
Communes of the Pyrénées-Orientales department

References

Communes of Pyrénées-Orientales
Pyrénées-Orientales communes articles needing translation from French Wikipedia